José Costa Pereira MPIH (born 15 September 1931) is a Portuguese former footballer who played as a goalkeeper. He was nicknamed Pássaro Azul (Blue Bird).

Club career
Born in Torres Vedras, Lisbon District, Pereira played at club level for C.F. Os Belenenses and S.C. Beira-Mar. He appeared in 302 Primeira Liga matches with the former, retiring with the latter at almost 40 and moving with his wife to Barcelona, completely removing himself from the football world.

International career
Pereira earned 11 caps for Portugal, making his debut on 19 April 1965 in a 1–0 away win over Turkey for the 1966 FIFA World Cup qualifiers at the age of 33. In the finals in England, manager Otto Glória picked Joaquim Carvalho for the first game against Hungary, which ended with a 3–1 victory, but Pereira would be first choice for the remainder of the tournament, with the national team finishing in a best-ever third place.

Pereira played his last international on 13 November 1966, appearing in a 2–1 home loss to Sweden for the UEFA Euro 1968 qualifying stage.

References

External links

1931 births
Living people
People from Torres Vedras
Sportspeople from Lisbon District
Portuguese footballers
Association football goalkeepers
Primeira Liga players
Liga Portugal 2 players
C.F. Os Belenenses players
S.C. Beira-Mar players
Portugal international footballers
1966 FIFA World Cup players